was one of the original karate masters of Okinawa. The years of his lifespan are reported variously as c.1809-1901 or 1798–1890 or 1809–1896 or 1800–1892.  However, the dates on the plaque at Matsumura's tomb, put there by Matsumura's family, clearly state that he was born in 1809 and died in 1899.

Early history

Matsumura Sōkon was born in Yamagawa Village, Shuri, Okinawa. Matsumura began the study of karate under the guidance of Sakukawa Kanga. Sakukawa was an old man at the time and reluctant to teach the young Matsumura, who was regarded as something of a troublemaker. However, Sakukawa had promised Kaiyo Sōfuku, Matsumura Sōkon’s father, that he would teach the boy, and thus he did. Matsumura spent five years studying under Sakukawa. As a young man, Matsumura had already garnered a reputation as an expert in the martial arts.

Royal Service

Matsumura was recruited into the service of the Shō family, the royal family of matsumura Ryūkyū Kingdom in 1836 and received the title Shikudon (also Chikudun Pechin), a gentry rank. He began his career by serving the 17th King of Ryūkyū's second Shō dynasty, King Shō Kō. In 1838 he married Yonamine Chiru, who was a martial arts expert as well. Matsumura eventually became the chief martial arts instructor and bodyguard for the Okinawan King Shō Kō. He subsequently served in this capacity for the last two Okinawan kings, Shō Iku and Shō Tai. Matsumura traveled on behalf of the royal government to Fuzhou and Satsuma. He studied Chuan Fa in China as well as other martial arts and brought what he learned back to Okinawa.

Jigen-ryū

He was the first to introduce the principles of Satsuma's swordsmanship school, Jigen-ryū, into Ryūkyū kobujutsu (Ryūkyūan traditional martial arts) and he is credited with creating the foundation for the bōjutsu of Tsuken. He passed on Jigen-ryū to some of his students, including Ankō Asato and Itarashiki Chochu. The Tsuken Bō tradition was perfected by Tsuken Seisoku Ueekata of Shuri.

Kata

Matsumura is credited with passing on the Shōrin-ryū Kempō-karate kata known as naihanchi I & II, passai, seisan, chintō, gojūshiho, kusanku (the embodiment of kusanku's teaching as passed on to Tode Sakugawa) and hakutsuru. The hakutsuru kata contains the elements of the Fujian White Crane system taught within the Shaolin system which was created by Fang Qiniang after destroying the gang who murdered her father Fang Zhonggong (Fang Shiyu). Lin Shixian was a Master of Black Crane and Eighteen Fist Monk Boxing. One of his Masters was Fang Zhonggong. He helped train Fang Quinang to defeat the gang who killed her father. Kwan Pang Yuiba (1828-1912) became master of Shaolin White Crane in the temple and supplanted Black Crane in 1837 as the official Temple Crane style, he was first student of Fāng Qīniáng.

Teachings of Bushi Matsumura

Matsumura was given the title "bushi" meaning "warrior" by the Okinawan king in recognition of his abilities and accomplishments in the martial arts. Described by Gichin Funakoshi as a sensei with a terrifying presence, Matsumura was never defeated in a duel, though he fought many. Tall, thin, and possessing a pair of unsettling eyes, Matsumura was described by his student Ankō Itosu as blindingly fast and deceptively strong.  His martial arts endeavors have been the progenitor of many contemporary karate styles: Shōrin-ryū, Shotokan, and Shitō-ryū, for example. Ultimately, all modern styles of karate that evolved from the Shuri-te lineage can be traced back to the teachings of Bushi Matsumura. Of note, his grandson was the modern Tōde master, Tsuyoshi Chitose, who assisted Gichin Funakoshi in the early introduction and teaching of karate in Japan and who founded the Chitō-ryū (千唐流 ?) style.

References

Matsumura, Sokon
1809 births
1899 deaths
19th-century Ryukyuan people
Karate coaches